Simo Elaković (Serbian Cyrillic: Симо Елаковић; born 1940 in Trebinje, SFRY – 10 July 2016) was a Serbian philosopher and Professor at University of Belgrade Faculty of Philosophy.

Biography 
After earning his degree in philosophy from the University of Belgrade, he has continued further specialization in Germany. He has worked as professor at a gymnasium in Dubrovnik and in Sremski Karlovci. He has been elected as assistant at the University of Zagreb Faculty of Economics. He worked as a Professor of Sociology at the University of Zagreb Faculty of Philosophy, then he moved to Belgrade, where he reaches a Professor of Philosophy title.

He was acting for head Department of Philosophy and simultaneously was a longtime Head of the History Department in the Philosophy Faculty, Belgrade. He also was a president of Serbian Philosophy Society.

He is the author of books including: Filozofija kao kritika društva (Philosophy as a Critic of Society), Sociologija slobodnog vremena i turizma – Fragmenti kritike svakodnevlja (Sociology of Free Time and Tourism – Fragments of Daily Critics), Pravci i smisao kretanja savremene filozofije (Directions & Sense of Contemporary Philosophy Motion), Sociokulturne promjene pod uticajem turizma na Jadranskom području (Social–Cultural Shifts Influenced by Tourism in the Adriatic Area), Rasprave o Evropi i filozofiji na kraju XX veka (Debates about Europe & Philosophy in the end of 20th century), Poslovna etika i komuniciranje (Business Ethics and Communication) and studies and debates in the field of classical German idealism, as well as contemporary philosophy and sociology.

References

External links 
 Simo Elaković at University of Belgrade, Faculty of Economy

Further reading 

 VUKIĆEVIĆ, Danica (2006). Srpska porodična enciklopedija, knjiga 9 (Ek–Za). Narodna knjiga, Politika NM. 

1940 births
20th-century Serbian philosophers
21st-century Serbian philosophers
Philosophy writers
Academic staff of the University of Belgrade
University of Belgrade Faculty of Philosophy alumni
2016 deaths